Aoung Bok (ေအာင္းေပါက္) is a village in Taungdwingyi Township, Magway, Myanmar.

Populated places in Magway Region